Farihibe 4 is a 2013 Maldivian period drama short-film directed by Abdulla Muaz. Produced by Mohamed Abdulla under Dhekedheke Ves Production, the film stars Mohamed Abdulla, Ismail Rasheed, Fathimath Azifa and Aishath Rishmy in pivotal roles. All the dialogues of the film were conveyed in the form of farihi, a traditional satirical format of a poem.

Premise
Farihibe (Mohamed Abdulla) is romantically attracted to a young pretty woman, Abidha (Fathimath Azifa) while her vile step-mother (Mariyam Haleem) arranges her marriage with wealthy businessman Ajumal (Ismail Rasheed) who is rumored to be having an affair with Suraiyya (Aishath Rishmy). Farihibe brings up his marriage proposal to Abidha's father who outright rejects him considering his impoverished nature.

Cast 
 Mohamed Abdulla as Farihibe
 Ismail Rasheed as Ajumal
 Fathimath Azifa as Abidha
 Aishath Rishmy as Suraiyya
 Mariyam Haleem as Abidha's step-mother

Soundtrack

Accolades

References

Maldivian short films
2013 short films
2013 films